The tooth-billed pigeon (Didunculus strigirostris), also known as the manumea, is a large pigeon found only in Samoa. It is the only living species of genus Didunculus. A related extinct species, the Tongan tooth-billed pigeon (Didunculus placopedetes), is only known from subfossil remains in several archeological sites in Tonga. The tooth-billed pigeon is the national bird of Samoa and featured on the 20 tālā bills and the 50 sene pieces of the 2008/2011 series.  Native only to Samoa's primary rainforest, it is considered to be endangered, with only a few hundred individuals thought to remain in existence.

Description 

The tooth-billed pigeon is a medium-sized, approximately 31 cm long, dark pigeon with reddish feet and red bare skin around the eye. The underparts, head and neck are greyish with a slight blue-green iridescence, and the tail, wings-coverts and tertials are rufous chestnut, while the remaining remiges are blackish. It has a large, curved, and hooked bright red bill with tooth-like projections on the lower mandible. Both sexes are similar, but the juvenile is duller with a browner head, with a black bill with only the base a pale orange.  Behaviourally, it is unusual - perhaps unique - among members of Columbiformes in drinking by scooping water up in its bill, in the manner of the great majority of bird species, rather than sucking it up using the tongue as a straw.

Taxonomy and systematics 
The species was probably found in October or November 1839, by the United States' Exploring Expedition under Commander Wilkes. The discovery of the bird was announced by Hugh Edwin Strickland in September 1844 as being among the rarities obtained by Mr. Titian Peale, the naturalist of the expedition. The formal description was made by William Jardine (Ann. Nat. Hist. xvi. p. 175, plate 9), under the name of Gnathodon strigirostris, although that genus name was already in use for a mollusc.

It has no close living relative, but it has been shown to be genetically close to the dodo, and the genus name Didunculus means "little dodo". the English name of dodlet was suggested by Sir Richard Owen. The jaw and tongue structure, and the superficially parrotlike bill have suggested a relationship to the parrots, but these features have arisen from its specialised diet rather than any real relationship.

The following cladogram, from Shapiro and colleagues (2002), shows the tooth-billed pigeon as the basal member of the clade and closest relationships within Columbidae, a clade consisting of generally ground-dwelling island endemics of which the Dodo is the most prominent.

A similar cladogram was published in 2007, differing only in the inverted placement of Goura and Didunculus, as well as in the inclusion of the pheasant pigeon and the thick-billed ground pigeon at the base of the clade.

Distribution and habitat 
The tooth-billed pigeon is confined to undisturbed forests of Samoa in the Pacific. Natural habitats for the tooth-billed pigeon in Samoa include the Central Savai'i Rainforest, Tafua Preserve, Fagaloa Bay – Uafato Tiavea Conservation Zone on Upolu Island, and Nu'ulua island. Little is known about the ecology and biology of the species but it is believed to feed on the fruits of Dysoxylum, a tree in the mahogany family. Manuscripts from the 1800s suggest chicks are confined to the forest floor. However the location of nests (in a tree or on the ground) is still unconfirmed.

Status 

Because of ongoing habitat loss, limited range, small population size, hunting and occasional cyclones as well as the likely impact of introduced species such as pigs, dogs, rats and cats, the tooth-billed pigeon is evaluated as critically endangered on the IUCN Red List of Threatened Species. Surveys suggest numbers are critical and that 70 to 380 individuals survive in the wild, and there is currently no captive population. No juveniles had been sighted during any recent surveys until the 2013 sighting of a single juvenile in the lowlands of Savaii during a survey of the Samoan Ministry of Natural Resources and the Environment. It is highly likely that chick mortality is high and the observed population are an aged population of adult birds. Actions to save this species will likely require conservation education to reduce hunting risk, and knowledge of the biology of the population and the reasons behind the current decline. Population control for rats and cats is likely to be critical, as is continuing deforestation and disappearance of old-growth forests.

In 2020 the bird was both heard and seen during a survey of forests on Savai'i.

References

External links 

 BirdLife Species Factsheet
 Extinction warning: racing to save the little dodo from its cousin's fate
 Tooth Billed Pigeon: Breed Guide - Pigeonpedia.com

tooth-billed pigeon
Birds of Samoa
Endemic fauna of Samoa
tooth-billed pigeon
tooth-billed pigeon